1284 Latvia, provisional designation , is a rare-type asteroid from the middle region of the asteroid belt, approximately 37 kilometers in diameter. It was discovered on 27 July 1933, by German astronomer Karl Reinmuth at Heidelberg Observatory in southern Germany, and named after the Republic of Latvia.

Orbit and classification 

Latvia orbits the Sun in the middle main-belt at a distance of 2.2–3.1 AU once every 4 years and 4 months (1,572 days). Its orbit has an eccentricity of 0.17 and an inclination of 11° with respect to the ecliptic.

The body's observation arc begins with its official discovery observation at Heidelberg in 1933.

Physical characteristics

Spectral type 

Latvia is classified as a rare T and L type asteroid in the Tholen and SMASS taxonomy scheme, respectively, both indicating a featureless spectra of a dark and reddish body.

Rotation period 

The so-far best rated rotational lightcurve of Latvia was obtained by the "Spanish Photometric Asteroid Analysis Group" (OBAS) in September 2015. Lightcurve analysis gave it a rotation period of 9.55 hours with a brightness variation of 0.23 magnitude.

Previous photometric observations by James W. Brinsfield at Via Capote Observatory  and French amateur astronomer Laurent Bernasconi gave a period of 9.552 and 9.644 hours with an amplitude of 0.10 and 0.21 magnitude, respectively. The first rotational lightcurve obtained by Richard P. Binzel in the 1980s gave a twice a long period solution of 18 hours.

Diameter and albedo 

According to the surveys carried out by the Infrared Astronomical Satellite IRAS, the Japanese Akari satellite, and NASA's Wide-field Infrared Survey Explorer with its subsequent NEOWISE mission, Latvia measures between 33.27 and 41.47 kilometers in diameter, and its surface has an albedo between 0.083 and 0.13 (without preliminary results). The Collaborative Asteroid Lightcurve Link adopts the results by IRAS, that is an albedo of 0.1045 and a diameter of 36.81 kilometers with an absolute magnitude of 10.24.

Naming 

This minor planet was named after the Republic of Latvia. Naming citation was first mentioned in The Names of the Minor Planets by Paul Herget in 1955.

References

External links 
 Asteroid Lightcurve Database (LCDB), query form (info )
 Dictionary of Minor Planet Names, Google books
 Asteroids and comets rotation curves, CdR – Observatoire de Genève, Raoul Behrend
 Discovery Circumstances: Numbered Minor Planets (1)-(5000) – Minor Planet Center
 
 

001284
Discoveries by Karl Wilhelm Reinmuth
Named minor planets
001284
001284
19330727